William Marriott (1880–1944) was an English footballer active in the early twentieth century. He played 8 times in The Football League for Aston Villa between 1901 and 1902, and also played for Bristol Rovers, Northampton Town, and New Brompton, where he made 83 league and FA Cup appearances.

References

1880 births
English footballers
Gillingham F.C. players
Northampton Town F.C. players
Aston Villa F.C. players
Bristol Rovers F.C. players
Footballers from Northampton
1944 deaths
Association footballers not categorized by position